India–Turkmenistan relations are the bilateral relations between India and Turkmenistan. India has an embassy in Ashgabat which opened in 1994. Turkmenistan has an embassy in New Delhi.

TAPI Pipeline

India has particular interest in Turkmenistan's hydrocarbon reserves 

Turkmenistan, Afghanistan, Pakistan and India, together known as the TAPI countries, are working on a gas pipeline which is scheduled for completion in early 2017. This is particularly important for India's burgeoning energy needs as on completion, the pipeline is expected to provide nearly 60% of India's energy needs.

Trade 

Total trade between Turkmenistan and India is meagre, amounting only to around US$42 million according to the Ministry of External Affairs of the Indian government.

Gallery

See also
 Foreign relations of India
 Foreign relations of Turkmenistan

Notes

External links

 
Turkmenistan
Bilateral relations of Turkmenistan